Fiona Milne (born September 6, 1971) is a Canadian rower. She attended the University of Toronto. She won a gold medal at the 2003 world championships in Milan, Italy in the lightweight women's single sculls event.

References

1971 births
Living people
Olympic rowers of Canada
Rowers at the 2000 Summer Olympics
Rowers at the 2004 Summer Olympics
Rowers from Ontario
Canadian female rowers
Pan American Games medalists in rowing
Pan American Games gold medalists for Canada
Pan American Games silver medalists for Canada
Rowers at the 2003 Pan American Games
Medalists at the 2003 Pan American Games
World Rowing Championships medalists for Canada
21st-century Canadian women